Keeni is a village in Otepää Parish, Valga County, in southern Estonia. It has a population of 331 (as of 1 January 2011).

Keeni Manor (Kehn, later Koenen, Konhöf) was first mentioned in 1551. From 1924 until its dispossession in 1920 the manor belonged to the Lilienfelds. A single-storey stone main building was constructed at the end of the 18th century, but was changed much in the 19th century. Nowadays it's again in private possession.

Since 1840 a school is working in Keeni.

Keeni has a station on Tartu–Valga railway. Võru–Tõrva road (nr. 69) passes through Keeni.

References

External links
Keeni manor
Keeni Manor at Estonian Manors Portal
Keeni primary school 

Villages in Valga County